Shang Kun (born 21 November 1990) is a Chinese table tennis player.

Achievements

ITTF Tours
Men's singles

References

1990 births
Living people
People from Yongji, Shanxi
Table tennis players from Shanxi
Shanghai Jiao Tong University alumni
Chinese male table tennis players
Chinese expatriate sportspeople in Germany
Universiade medalists in table tennis
Universiade silver medalists for China
Universiade bronze medalists for China
Universiade gold medalists for China
Medalists at the 2011 Summer Universiade
Medalists at the 2013 Summer Universiade
21st-century Chinese people